The Whispering Skull is a 1944 American Western film directed by Elmer Clifton and written by Harry L. Fraser. The film stars Tex Ritter, Dave O'Brien, Guy Wilkerson, Denny Burke, I. Stanford Jolley and Henry Hall. The film was released on December 29, 1944, by Producers Releasing Corporation.

Plot

In the old west, someone is killing people in the middle of the night. Multiple murders by a mysterious killer known as "the Whispering Skull. It's up to Tex Haines, played by good-guy Tex Ritter, to lead the Texas Rangers and capture the midnight marauder.

Cast          
Tex Ritter as Tex Haines
Dave O'Brien as Dave Wyatt
Guy Wilkerson as Panhandle Perkins
Denny Burke as Ellen Jackson
I. Stanford Jolley as Duke Walters
Henry Hall as Judge Polk
George Morrell as Sheriff Marvin Jackson
Ed Cassidy as Doc Humphrey 
Bob Kortman as Joe Carter 
Wen Wright as Mike Coram

See also
The Texas Rangers series:
 The Rangers Take Over (1942)
 Bad Men of Thunder Gap (1943)
 West of Texas (1943)
 Border Buckaroos (1943)
 Fighting Valley (1943)
 Trail of Terror (1943)
 The Return of the Rangers (1943)
 Boss of Rawhide (1943)
 Outlaw Roundup (1944)
 Guns of the Law (1944)
 The Pinto Bandit (1944)
 Spook Town (1944)
 Brand of the Devil (1944)
 Gunsmoke Mesa (1944)
 Gangsters of the Frontier (1944)
 Dead or Alive (1944)
 The Whispering Skull (1944)
 Marked for Murder (1945)
 Enemy of the Law (1945)
 Three in the Saddle (1945)
 Frontier Fugitives (1945)
 Flaming Bullets (1945)

References

External links
 

1944 films
1940s English-language films
American Western (genre) films
1944 Western (genre) films
Producers Releasing Corporation films
Films directed by Elmer Clifton
Films with screenplays by Harry L. Fraser
American black-and-white films
1940s American films